Perittia herrichiella is a moth of the family Elachistidae. It is found from Sweden and Finland to the Pyrenees and Italy and from France to the Baltic region and Romania. It has also been recorded from Russia and North America, including New York, Ontario, Indiana and Michigan. The expected range of the species is south-eastern Canada and the north-central and north-eastern parts of the United States.

The wingspan is 8–9 mm. Adults are on wing from May to August.

The larvae feed on Lonicera alpigena, Lonicera periclymenum, Lonicera tatarica, Lonicera xylosteum and Symphoricarpos albus. They mine the leaves of their host plant. The mine starts as a short corridor. Which is followed (and often overrun) by a large flat blotch that expands towards the leaf margin. The frass is deposited in scattered blackish lumps. Larvae can be found from June to mid August or October depending on the location.

References

External links
lepiforum.de

Moths described in 1855
Elachistidae
Moths of Europe
Moths of North America
Taxa named by Gottlieb August Wilhelm Herrich-Schäffer